Pinehaven is a census-designated place (CDP) in McKinley County, New Mexico, United States. It was first listed as a CDP prior to the 2020 census.

Whitewater Arroyo flows through the central part of the CDP, running southwest to join the Puerco River near Houck, Arizona.

Demographics

Education
It is in Gallup-McKinley County Public Schools.

References 

Census-designated places in McKinley County, New Mexico
Census-designated places in New Mexico